Richard Križan (born 23 September 1997) is a Slovak footballer who plays for Fortuna liga club Slovan Bratislava as a defender.

Club career

FC Nitra
Križan made his Fortuna Liga debut for Nitra against Žilina on 22 July 2017 during an 1–0 home victory.

Honours
Slovan Bratislava
Fortuna Liga: 2021–22

References

External links
 FC Nitra official club profile
 
 Futbalnet profile

1997 births
Living people
People from Plášťovce
Sportspeople from the Nitra Region
Slovak footballers
Slovakia under-21 international footballers
Slovak expatriate footballers
Association football defenders
FC Nitra players
Puskás Akadémia FC players
AS Trenčín players
ŠK Slovan Bratislava players
Slovak Super Liga players
2. Liga (Slovakia) players
Nemzeti Bajnokság I players
Expatriate footballers in Hungary
Slovak expatriate sportspeople in Hungary